Rojek is a Polish-language surname. Notable people with the surname include:

Artur Rojek (born 1972), Polish guitarist and singer
Józef Rojek (born 1950), Polish politician
Krzysztof Rojek (born 1972), Polish boxer
Stan Rojek (1919-1997), American baseball player

See also

Polish-language surnames